Nielsen's theorem is a result in quantum information concerning transformations between bipartite states due to Michael Nielsen. It makes use of majorization.

Statement 

This can be written more concisely as

 iff .

Proof 
The proof is detailed in the paper and will be added here at a later date.

References

Quantum information theory